Mookambika Road Byndoor  is a railway station in coastal Karnataka in South India. Its four-letter code is BYNR.
Mookambika Road Byndoor is the main railway station in the town of Byndoor in  Udupi district. It serves Byndoor city which is 1 kilometre away from the station. It is the nearest railway station to the famous pilgrimage centre, Kollur Mookambika temple. The distance from Byndoor railway station to Kollur Mookambika temple is about 28 km which can be covered in 40 minutes to one hour by road. Trains from here connect the city to prominent state capitals of India like Bangalore (Karnataka), Thiruvananthapuram (Kerala, via Southern Railway), Mumbai (Maharashtra, via Konkan Railways) and so forth. It is also well connected to the major railway stations such as Goa (Madgoan), Udupi, Mangalore, Kasaragod and Ernakulam. Rail connectivity in Byndoor was established in 1997. A total of 34  express and passenger trains halt here; there was one originating and terminating trains at this station: Mookambika Road–Kannur Passenger train; however this service was terminated in 2017 within two years of service due to lack of revenue generation.  Although the railway station caters to a lot of passengers and superfast trains on a daily basis, it does not have a siding line or passing loop. Any crossing of trains can only happen either on Bijoor or Shiroor railway stations 19 km apart.

Background
A KRCL official said that with a 93-m long station building and 10 m x 600 m platform, the Byndoor station is the biggest station in the Konkan Railway network, after Madgaon. The station is directly connected to Mangalore, Bangalore, Mumbai, New Delhi, Amritsar, Chandighar, Pune, Ajmer, Jaipur, Rajkot, Ahmedabad, Okha, Mysore, Belgaum, Jodhpur, Agra, Thiruvananthapuram, Ernakulam, Kozhikode, Kollam.

Infrastructure
This station has One platforms and Kollour Mookambika Temple type Building is the main Highlight.

Major trains from Byndoor station

 Mumbai LTT - Kochuveli Garibrath AC Express 
 POORNA EXPRESS Kochi to Pune
 Marusagar Super Fast Express
 Netravati Express
 Matsyagandha Express
 Jabalpur–Coimbatore Superfast Special
 Kannur–Mookambika Road Passenger
 Panchaganga Express
 Mangaluru Central–Madgaon DEMU
 Mangaluru Central–Madgaon Passenger
 Bangalore City–Karwar Express
 Yesvantpur–Karwar Express
 Mumbai CST–Mangaluru Junction Superfast Express
 Madgaon–Mangaluru Intercity Express
 Ernakulam–Okha Express
 Thiruvananthapuram–Veraval Express
 Kochuveli–Bhavnagar Express
 Kochuveli–Shri Ganganagar Junction Express
 Gandhidham–Nagercoil Express

Location
It lies off the Kanyakumari–Panvel Road, in Mookambika Road Byndoor, PIN Code 576214. The Mangalore Bajpe Airport (Code: IXE) is 98 km away. The station is located at an elevation of 15 metres above sea level. It lies within the KR/Konkan Zone under the Karwar railway division.

Other stations
It falls under Karwar railway division of Konkan Railway zone, a subsidiary zone of Indian Railways.
under the jurisdiction of Konkan Railway.  Mookambika Road Byndoor has 3 stations viz Shiroor, Bijoor Halt, Senapur

References

External links

Railway stations in Uttara Kannada district
Railway stations along Konkan Railway line
Railway stations opened in 1997
Karwar railway division